Jean-Louis Brian (1805 Avignon-1864 Paris) was a French sculptor.

Brian was a pupil of David d'Angers. In 1832, he won, together with François Jouffroy, the Premier Grand Prix de Rome in sculpture with his statue Capanée foudroyé sous les murs de Thèbes.

Main works

 Jeanne d'Albret, statue, stone, Paris, Jardin du Luxembourg
 Saint Marc, statue, stone, Paris, place Franz Liszt, facade of the church of Saint Vincent de Paul
 Caryatid, stone, Paris, Palais du Louvre
 Portrait of Pierre-Marie Baillot, violinist, 1772–1842, marble, Versailles, Palace of Versailles
 Portrait of Joseph Romain-Desfossés, admiral, 1798–1864, bust, marble, Versailles, Palace of Versailles
 Portrait of Leo Strozzi, prior of Capua, general of the galleys, 1515–1554, 1840, bust, plaster, Versailles, Palace of Versailles
 Faun standing looking at its tail, Avignon, Calvet Museum, marble, 1840

References
 Simone Hoog, (preface by Jean-Pierre Babelon, in collaboration with Roland Brossard), Musée national de Versailles. Les sculptures. I- Le musée, Réunion des musées nationaux, Paris, 1993
 Pierre Kjellberg, Le Nouveau guide des statues de Paris, La Bibliothèque des Arts, Paris, 1988
 Emmanuel Schwartz, Les Sculptures de l'École des Beaux-Arts de Paris. Histoire, doctrines, catalogue, École nationale supérieure des Beaux-Arts, Paris, 2003

1805 births
1864 deaths
Artists from Avignon
Prix de Rome for sculpture
19th-century French sculptors
French male sculptors
19th-century French male artists